The Parent Trap is a 1998 American romantic comedy film directed and co-written by Nancy Meyers, and produced and co-written by Charles Shyer. It is a remake of the 1961 film of the same name and an adaptation of Erich Kästner's 1949 German novel Lisa and Lottie (Das doppelte Lottchen).

Dennis Quaid and Natasha Richardson star as a divorced couple who separated shortly after their identical twin daughters' birth; Lindsay Lohan stars (in her film debut) as both twins, Hallie Parker and Annie James, who are fortuitously reunited at summer camp after being separated at birth. David Swift wrote the screenplay for the original 1961 film based on Lottie and Lisa. Swift is credited along with Meyers and Shyer as co-writers of the 1998 version.

The Parent Trap was theatrically released in the United States on July 29, 1998 and was a box-office hit, grossing $92.1 million against a $15 million budget. It received positive reviews from critics, with Lohan's performance in particular earning high praise.

Plot 
In 1986, Nick Parker and Elizabeth James meet on the Queen Elizabeth 2, fall in love and get married. Soon, Elizabeth gives birth to twins named Hallie and Annie. Shortly after the twins' birth, Nick and Elizabeth divorce, with Nick being given custody over Hallie and raising her in Napa, California, where he owns his own vineyard. Meanwhile, Elizabeth raises Annie in London, England, where she works as a wedding gown designer.

11 years and 9 months later in the year 1998, the twins are coincidentally sent to the same summer camp where they form an intense rivalry. When Hallie and her friends perform a dangerous prank on Annie's cabin, Hallie and Annie are sent to the isolation cabin, where they begin to bond over some of their common interests. When they realize each has a divorced parent, they show one another a photograph of the parents, with whom they have never met, and discover they are twins who were separated at birth. They decide to switch places to get their parents to meet again and get back together; each girl trains the other to be like her.

In London, Hallie happily meets Elizabeth, the family butler Martin and her maternal grandfather. She learns that Elizabeth and Nick met on a cruise line and fell in love. Meanwhile, in California, Annie meets Nick and their family nanny, Chessy. Much to her dismay, she learns that Nick has fallen in love with a young woman named Meredith Blake, who only has an interest in Nick's fortune. Annie phones Hallie and attempts to persuade her to bring their mother to California to try and break up Nick and Meredith, but Hallie refuses.

Chessy, meanwhile, has noticed that "Hallie" has changed a lot; Annie reveals her identity, but Chessy keeps this a secret. Nick informs Annie that he is marrying Meredith, much to Annie's dismay. In a phone conversation, Annie informs Hallie of the upcoming wedding between Nick and Meredith. However, Hallie is discovered by her grandfather, who forces her to tell her mother that she is in fact Hallie, not Annie. Elizabeth and Hallie decide that they need to travel to California to agree on joint custody of the twins between each parent.

Annie and Hallie both arrange with Martin and Chessy for a meeting between Nick and Elizabeth at the Stafford Hotel in California, although only Elizabeth is aware of this. Elizabeth and Nick are reunited, and Nick happily realizes that he has had Annie with him since the end of camp. Elizabeth also meets Meredith and learns that she and Nick will be getting married. Annie and Hallie attempt to recreate the night where their parents met by arranging dinner on a yacht. The two discuss their breakup, which occurred with Elizabeth running off, after a fight, although she secretly hoped Nick would go after her, which he didn't. Nick and Elizabeth agree that Hallie will go to London over Christmas and Annie will spend Easter in California, but decide against resuming their relationship, with Elizabeth planning to fly back to London with Annie the next day. However, the twins refuse to reveal which one is which unless the four of them go on a camping trip together. Elizabeth insists that Meredith go in her place, wanting her to get to know the girls before she marries Nick.

The girls play a series of pranks on Meredith, including putting a lizard on her head and filling her insect repellant with sugar and water. When the girls place her mattress on a lake, Meredith is furious and vows to get rid of them, demanding that Nick choose between her and them. Finally, seeing Meredith's true nature, Nick chooses the girls over her, causing a dismayed Meredith to break off the engagement and call off the wedding. On returning home, Nick is somewhat relieved to be free of Meredith. He shows Elizabeth his wine collection, which includes wine they drank at their wedding. The two realize they are still in love, but decide to go their separate ways with the twin they have custody of.

Elizabeth and Annie arrive back in London. They are stunned to find Nick and Hallie, who flew to London via Concorde. Nick reveals he didn't want to make the same mistake of not going after her again. The two finally kiss, signifying their intention to resume their marriage. The end credits show photographs from their wedding, which also takes place on the Queen Elizabeth 2, with Hallie and Annie as bridesmaids and Chessy and Martin getting engaged.

Cast and characters 
 Lindsay Lohan as Hallie Parker and Annie James, eleven-year-old twin sisters who were separated after birth. Following their parents' divorce, they were raised separately with no knowledge of each other's existence — until they meet at summer camp by chance.
Erin Mackey was Lohan's acting double for the scenes where the twins appear together.
 Dennis Quaid as Nicholas "Nick" Parker, Annie and Hallie's father, a wealthy American vineyard owner.
 Natasha Richardson as Elizabeth "Liz"  James, Annie and Hallie's mother, a famous British wedding gown designer.
 Elaine Hendrix as Meredith Blake, a 26-year-old publicist who is planning to marry Nick for his money.
 Lisa Ann Walter as Chessy, Nick's housekeeper and Hallie's nanny. She has long considered herself rather awkward and thus not overly desirable to eligible bachelors, but then she meets Martin, and the two are mutually smitten. She also discovers that "Hallie" is actually Annie after noticing her strange behavior.
 Simon Kunz as Martin, the James family's butler, who falls in love with Chessy.
 Polly Holliday as Marva Kulp Sr., the owner and director of Camp Walden.
 Maggie Wheeler as Marva Kulp Jr., Marva Sr.'s daughter and assistant.
 Ronnie Stevens as Charles James, Elizabeth's wealthy father and Annie and Hallie's maternal grandfather. After he catches Hallie on the phone with Annie, she tells him about switching places.
 Joanna Barnes as Vicki Blake, Meredith's mother.
 Hallie Meyers-Shyer as Lindsay
 J. Patrick McCormack as Les Blake, Meredith's father.

Kat Graham played Jackie, a friend of Annie at Camp Walden. Vendela Kirsebom appears as a model during a photoshoot sequence at Elizabeth James' studio. Meyers and Shyer's daughters Hallie Meyers-Shyer and Annie Meyers-Shyer make appearances in the film, credited as Lindsay and Towel Girl, respectively. Lohan's brother Michael (credited as Lost Boy At Camp) plays a boy at Camp Walden who did not realize he was going to an all-girls camp. Lohan's mother, Dina, and other siblings Aliana and Cody, all appear in uncredited cameos at the airport in London. The film's cinematographer Dean Cundey appears in an uncredited cameo as the captain of the Queen Elizabeth 2, who marries Nick and Elizabeth at the beginning of the film. Jeannette Charles portrayed Queen Elizabeth II in a deleted scene in which she and Hallie meet.

Production

Casting 
More than 1,500 young actresses submitted audition tapes for the dual roles of Hallie and Annie. Director Nancy Meyers was looking for "a little Diane Keaton" to play the parts. Before Lohan was cast in the roles, actresses Scarlett Johansson, Mara Wilson, Michelle Trachtenberg, and Jena Malone all either auditioned or were considered for the roles, with Malone turning the roles down multiple times.

Filming 
Principal photography started on July 15, 1997, in London, United Kingdom, and continued in Napa Valley AVA, San Francisco, Lake Arrowhead, and Los Angeles, California to December 17, 1997. Camp Walden was filmed on location at Camp Seely in Crestline, California. Parker Knoll, the vineyard and residence of the Parker family in the film, was shot on location in Rutherford, California at Staglin Family Vineyard. The exterior of the fictional Stafford Hotel was shot at The Langham Huntington in Pasadena, California and the Administration Building, Treasure Island in San Francisco, while the interior and pool scenes were shot at the Ritz-Carlton in Marina del Rey, California.

Connections to the 1961 film 
There are several connections between this film and the original 1961 version:
 The characters Marva Kulp Sr. and Marva Kulp Jr. are named after Nancy Kulp, the actress who played a camp counsellor in the 1961 film, Miss Grunecker.
 Both versions of the film feature product placement by Nabisco. In the 1998 film, Oreos are featured, while in the 1961 film, Fig Newtons are featured.
 During the poolside scene where Annie and Meredith meet for the first time, Meredith speaks on the phone with someone named Reverend Mosby, who was a character in the 1961 film played by Leo G. Carroll.
 Joanna Barnes appears in both films, playing Vicky Robinson in the 1961 film, and Vicki Blake in the 1998 version. 
 The Stafford Hotel is named after a boy in the 1961 film that accepts the boy's camp invitation to the dance at the beginning of the film.
 Right before Hallie meets Meredith for the first time, she can be heard singing a few bars of "Let's Get Together", a song from the 1961 version originally sung by Hayley Mills.
 There are bunk houses named Arapahoe in both films.
 Hallie (as Annie) "smells" her grandfather, saying he smells of peppermint and pipe tobacco. Susan (as Sharon) does the same in the 1961 film.

Music 
The song used in the opening sequence, in which glimpses of Nick and Elizabeth's first wedding are seen, is Nat King Cole's "L-O-V-E". The song used in the end credits, in which photos of Nick and Elizabeth's second wedding are seen, is his daughter Natalie Cole's "This Will Be (An Everlasting Love)".

The instrumental music featured prominently in the hotel scene where the girls and their parents cross paths serendipitously is "In the Mood", which was previously made famous by the Glenn Miller band. The song "Let's Get Together" is also quoted over the Walt Disney Pictures logo, and at the end of Alan Silvestri's closing credits suite.

When Hallie shows up at Annie's poker game at Camp Walden, the music used is "Bad to the Bone" by George Thorogood and the Destroyers.

The tune playing as Hallie and Annie are making their way up to the Isolation Cabin is the main theme from "The Great Escape" by Elmer Bernstein.

The song coming from the radio in Meredith's car as she pulls up to the Parker's home is "Parents Just Don't Understand" by DJ Jazzy Jeff & The Fresh Prince.

The background song heard in the campfire scene is "How Bizarre" by the music group OMC.

The song playing as Annie, Elizabeth, and Martin say goodbye to Hallie, Nick and Chessy toward the end of the film is "Ev'ry Time We Say Goodbye", performed by Ray Charles & Betty Carter.

Soundtrack

Film score

Notes 
 1.Not featured in the motion picture.

Reception

Box office 
The film premiered in Los Angeles on July 20, 1998. In its opening weekend, the film grossed $11,148,497 in 2,247 theaters in the United States and Canada, ranking #2 at the box office, behind Saving Private Ryan. By the end of its run, The Parent Trap grossed $66,308,518 domestically and $25,800,000 internationally, totaling $92,108,518 worldwide. The film was released in the United Kingdom on December 11, 1998, and opened on #3, behind Rush Hour and The Mask of Zorro.

Critical response 
The review aggregator website Rotten Tomatoes reported an approval rating of 86% based on 51 reviews, with an average rating of 6.8/10. The website's critics consensus states: "Writer-director Nancy Meyers takes the winning formula of the 1961 original and gives it an amiable modern spin, while young star Lindsay Lohan shines in her breakout role." Metacritic gave the film a weighted average score of 64 out of 100, based from 19 critics, indicating "generally favorable reviews."

Gene Siskel and Roger Ebert each gave the film three stars. Critic Kenneth Turan called Lohan "the soul of this film as much as Hayley Mills was of the original", going on to say that "she is more adept than her predecessor at creating two distinct personalities". Lohan won a Young Artist Award for best performance in a feature film.

In a 2021 interview, star of the original film Hayley Mills said, "It was so like the one I did, and yet not. But I thought it was really good." She also praised Lohan's performance, calling her "excellent".

Accolades

Home media 
The Parent Trap was originally released on VHS in the United States on December 8, 1998. A 20th Anniversary Edition Blu-ray was released as a Disney Movie Club Exclusive on April 24, 2018. The film was also available as a launch title on Disney+.

Remake 
On February 21, 2018, The Hollywood Reporter revealed that remakes of several films are in development as exclusive content for The Walt Disney Company's streaming service Disney+ with one of those projects named in the announcement as The Parent Trap.
 Malayalam TV series Kasthooriman Season 2 is a loose adaptation of the movie.

Reunion 
On July 20, 2020, Katie Couric moderated a virtual cast reunion through her Instagram account for the film's 22nd anniversary. Lindsay Lohan, Dennis Quaid, Elaine Hendrix, Lisa Ann Walter, Simon Kunz, Nancy Meyers, and Charles Shyer all participated in the video chat. A charity fundraising effort during the COVID-19 pandemic, the reunion special helped raise money for chef José Andrés' non-profit organization World Central Kitchen. Quaid then released an extended version of the reunion on his podcast The Dennissance on the following day.

References

External links 

 
 
 
 
 
 

1998 films
1998 children's films
1998 directorial debut films
1998 romantic comedy films
1990s children's comedy films
American children's comedy films
American romantic comedy films
Comedy of remarriage films
Disney film remakes
1990s English-language films
Remakes of American films
Films about families
Films about fashion designers
Films about pranks
Films about summer camps
Films about twin sisters
Films about weddings
Films based on German novels
Films based on Lottie and Lisa
Films directed by Nancy Meyers
Films scored by Alan Silvestri
Films set in London
Films set in Maine
Films set in the San Francisco Bay Area
Films shot in California 
Films shot in London
Films shot in Los Angeles
Films shot in San Francisco
Films with screenplays by Charles Shyer
Films with screenplays by Nancy Meyers
5
Walt Disney Pictures films
Twins in American films
Films about mother–daughter relationships
Films about father–daughter relationships
1990s American films